Dromolaxia is a village near Larnaca International Airport, in Larnaca District, Cyprus. In 2011, it had a population of 5,064.

History
It has been a settlement since the Middle Bronze Age.

Dromolaxia Vizatzia was "a Late Cypriote city". Archaeological excavations in 1972, a few hundred meters West of Hala Sultan Tekke (by E. Åström and A. Hatziantoniou) pointed to a settlement dating "from Middle Cypriote III to Late Cypriote I but also from Late Cypriote IIC to IIIA and later".

Football team 

Dromolaxia's football team is Thyella and has been in the 4th division. Due to economical and political reasons, the community president decided to withdraw the team from the league. It has been suggested that the team be merged with Salamina Dromolaxias, the team of the refugees who came to Dromolaxia in 1974 due to the Turkish invasion.

References

External links
A' Primary School of Dromolaxia
B' Primary School of Dromolaxia

Dromolaxia–Meneou Municipality